Rafaela Ottiano (4 March 1888 – 15 August 1942) was an Italian-American stage and film actress.

Early life
Rafaela Ottiano was born in Venice, Italy. She immigrated to the United States with her parents and was processed at Ellis Island in 1910. (Another source says that she and her sister, Maria Francesca, arrived in New York on April 30, 1899.)

Ottiano was named for a sister, Rafaela Bellizia Ottiano, who was born in Boston in 1886 and died in infancy. Their parents were Antonio Ottiano, a musician, and his wife, Maddalena Polcari Ottiano. The couple also had three sons, Pasquale, James, and Augustino. The family lived in Boston.

Ottiano worked as a saleslady in a New York City department store before she began her acting career.

Career
Ottiano began acting at age 18 and established herself as a stage actress in Europe before arriving in Hollywood in 1924 and appearing in American motion pictures. She appeared on Broadway in Sweeney Todd (1924), the Mae West play Diamond Lil (1928), and the play version of Grand Hotel (1930).

Ottiano's first film was the John L. McCutcheon-directed drama The Law and the Lady (1924) with Len Leo, Alice Lake, and Tyrone Power, Sr.

Ottiano was part of the original 1928 Broadway cast of the hit play Diamond Lil, written by and starring Mae West. She reprised her role as Rita when the play was adapted for the movie She Done Him Wrong (1933), directed by Lowell Sherman.

Throughout the 1930s, she often specialized in roles as sinister, malevolent, or spiteful women, such as her role in the Tod Browning-directed horror film The Devil-Doll (1936), opposite Lionel Barrymore and Maureen O'Sullivan.

Other notable film roles for Ottiano include Lena in As You Desire Me (1932) with Greta Garbo, Melvyn Douglas, Erich von Stroheim, Owen Moore, and Hedda Hopper, Mrs. Higgins in the Shirley Temple musical-comedy Curly Top (1935), as a matron in the crime-drama Riffraff (1936), starring Jean Harlow and Spencer Tracy, and as Suzette, Greta Garbo's devoted maid in the Edmund Goulding-directed drama Grand Hotel (1932).

When Grand Hotel was turned into a Broadway Musical in 1989, her character was renamed Rafaela Ottiano in honor of the actress, who had appeared on Broadway in 1930 in the original play version of the Vicki Baum novel, and in the subsequent movie adaptation.

Ottiano's last film was the musical comedy I Married an Angel (1942), starring Nelson Eddy and Jeanette MacDonald. During her film career, she appeared in approximately 45 motion pictures, opposite such actors as Barbara Stanwyck, Conrad Nagel, Peter Lorre, Zasu Pitts, and Katharine Hepburn.

Personal life
Ottiano died on August 15, 1942, in her parents' Boston home, aged 54.

Partial filmography

The Law and the Lady (1924) - Ma Sims
Married ? (1926) - Maid
Grand Hotel (1932) - Suzette
Night Court (1932) - Evil Tongued Neighbor (uncredited)
As You Desire Me (1932) - Lena
The Washington Masquerade (1932) - Mona
She Done Him Wrong (1933) - Russian Rita
Bondage (1933) - Miss Trigge
Ann Vickers (1933) - Mrs. Feldermans
Female (1933) - Della - Alison's Maid (uncredited)
Mandalay (1934) - Madame Lacalles
All Men Are Enemies (1934) - Filomena
The Last Gentleman (1934) - Retta Barr
A Lost Lady (1934) - Rosa
Great Expectations (1934) - Mrs. Joe
Enchanted April (1935) - Francesca
Lottery Lover (1935) - Gaby's Maid
The Florentine Dagger (1935) - Lili Salvatore
One Frightened Night (1935) - Elvira
Curly Top (1935) - Mrs. Higgins
Remember Last Night? (1935) - Mme. Bouclier
Crime and Punishment (1935) - Landlady (uncredited)
We're Only Human (1935) - Mrs. William Anderson (uncredited)
Riffraff (1936) - Matron
The Devil-Doll (1936) - Malita
Anthony Adverse (1936) - Signora Buvino
Mad Holiday (1936) - Ning
That Girl from Paris (1936) - Nikki's Personal Maid (uncredited)
Seventh Heaven (1937) - Madame Frisson
Maytime (1937) - Ellen
The League of Frightened Men (1937) - Dora Chapin
The Toy Wife (1938) - Felicianne (uncredited)
Marie Antoinette (1938) - Louise - Marie's Maid (uncredited)
I'll Give a Million (1938) - Proprietress
Suez (1938) - Maria De Teba
Paris Honeymoon (1939) - Fluschotska
Vigil in the Night (1940) - Mrs. Henrietta Sullivan (uncredited)
The Long Voyage Home (1940) - Bella
A Little Bit of Heaven (1940) - Mme. Lupinsky
Victory (1940) - Madame Makanoff
Topper Returns (1941) - Lillian - the Housekeeper
The Adventures of Martin Eden (1942) - Marie Sylva
I Married an Angel (1942) - Madelon (uncredited) (final film role)

References

External links

 

 
 Rafaela Ottiano: The Venetian who Played the Villainess

1888 births
1942 deaths
American film actresses
American stage actresses
Italian emigrants to the United States
Italian stage actresses
Actors from Venice
People from East Boston, Boston
20th-century American actresses
Naturalized citizens of the United States
Actresses from Boston